Soy inocente is a 2023 Peruvian comedy mystery film directed by Pedro Flores Maldonado and written by Maldonado & Yiddá Eslava (who also co-produced with Julián Zucchi). Starring Yiddá Eslava. The film features the performance of the Argentine singer Pablo Ruiz who acts of himself. It premiered on January 19, 2023 in Peruvian theaters.

Synopsis 
Sofia leads an austere life as a housekeeper, wanting to save every penny to support her grandmother and siblings. A day like any other, she is involved in a crime scene in a hotel room. She's innocent, but her fingerprints are everywhere. To keep her job at the colonial hotel and, most importantly, not go to jail, Sofia must prove her innocence. But he needs help, which is why he also incriminates Mame, his co-worker.

Cast 
The actors participating in this film are:

 Yiddá Eslava as Sofía
 Mariella Zanetti as María Melissa 'Mame'
 Yarlo Ruiz as Amadeo
 Rodolfo Carrión as Anacleto 'Lagartija'
 Édgar Vivar as Fran
 Pietro Sibille as Roberto
 Patricia Portocarrero as Agata / TV presenter
 Eva Ayllón as Eva
 Jorge Mena as Dangerous Fat
 Pablo Ruiz as himself

Production 
Principal photography began in early September 2022 and ended on October 2 of the same year.

Reception 
Soy inocente drew over 30,000 viewers in its opening weekend.

References

External links 
 

2023 films
2023 comedy films
2020s Spanish-language films
2020s Peruvian films
Peruvian comedy mystery films
Peruvian crime comedy films
Wallaz Producciones films
Films set in Peru
Films shot in Peru
Films set in hotels
Films about murder